The first Annual American Music Awards was a televised awards show, produced by Dick Clark Productions, which aired on ABC February 19, 1974.

Winners and nominees

References
 http://www.rockonthenet.com/archive/1974/amas.htm

1974